Holy Cross High School was an all-boys, Roman Catholic high school in River Grove, Illinois, United States that operated from August 1961 until June 2004. In December, 2003, the school announced that they no longer had enough funding or interest in enrollment to continue. Only 79 students took the entrance exam for the 2004–2005 school year, and at least 125 were necessary to keep the school open. In June, 2004, the neighboring all-girls high school Mother Theodore Guerin High School accepted all Holy Cross students, becoming coed and changing their name to Guerin College Preparatory High School. Students from Mother Guerin and Holy Cross had already been sharing each other's facilities for certain classes, such as drama, music, and foreign languages.

At one point, Holy Cross's enrollment was as high as 1,556 students. The school expanded its facilities in 1969 with the construction of a humanities learning center.

Chicago Cubs
The school had a close connection to the Chicago Cubs baseball team in the late 1960s and early 1970s. Third-baseman Ron Santo ran a baseball academy on the Holy Cross grounds, and the Cubs helped fund equipment for the school's baseball team. The Cubs even held their workouts at the school in spring 1972, in the midst of a strike which had shut down all of the major league training camps.

Athletics
Holy Cross's sports teams were known as the Crusaders. Their baseball team earned six regional championships, two sectional championships, and two appearances in the IHSA State Finals, while their football team had two undefeated regular seasons and six state playoff berths.

1974 graduation controversy
In 1974, principal Raymond Dufresne cancelled Holy Cross's graduation ceremony and baccalaureate mass after a group of seniors threw firecrackers and honked their car horns in the school parking lot during a graduation rehearsal. Their actions prompted a police visit to the school, though no one was arrested. Afterwards, Dufresne wrote a letter to parents, stating, "Unfortunately, the behavior of too many of the class of 1974 . . . was not something we can look to with pride or joy. . . . Our decision is that there will be no graduation ceremony." After meeting with faculty and parents, Dufresne decided to reinstate the ceremonies, but required that students sit with their parents, instead of in a group.

Notable alumni
Yashar Ali, American freelance journalist
Val Belmonte, former college hockey coach and college athletic director, winner of the 1987 CCHA Coach of the Year Award
John Carpino (1977), current President of the Los Angeles Angels of Anaheim
Tony Fiore (1990), pitcher drafted by the Philadelphia Phillies in the 1992 MLB Draft (28th round)
Joseph Grendys, billionaire meat processor, Owner Koch Foods
Joe Principe, bass guitarist of Rise Against
Mike Rizzo (1979), current President/General Manager of the Washington Nationals
Bobby Stevens (2005), shortstop drafted by the Baltimore Orioles in the 2008 MLB Draft (16th round)
Garrett Wolfe (2002), All-American running back at NIU, 2006 NCAA leading rusher, drafted by the Chicago Bears in the 2007 NFL Draft (3rd round)

References

External links
 Holy Cross Glory Days

Boys' schools in Illinois
Defunct Catholic secondary schools in Illinois
Holy Cross secondary schools
Educational institutions established in 1961
1961 establishments in Illinois
Educational institutions disestablished in 2004
2004 disestablishments in Illinois
Former high schools in Illinois